Xylecata crassiantennata is a moth of the  subfamily Arctiinae. It is found on Madagascar.

References

Nyctemerina